Tso (Tsóbó, Lotsu, Cibbo) is one of the Savanna languages of eastern Nigeria.

Dialects
The language is known as nyi tsó, while the people are known as Tsobo [tsó-bó]. The ethnic subgroups are,
Bərbou
Swaabou
Gusobu

A subsection of the Gusobu may also live in Luzoo settlement.

Each ethnic subgroup speaks a different Tso dialect. The Swaabou and Gusobu reportedly have trouble understanding each other. Tso lexical diversity is partly due to the tradition of word tabooing.

References

Waja languages
Languages of Nigeria